Vetren may refer to:

 In Bulgaria (the name is written Ветрен):
 Vetren, Pazardzhik Province - a town in the Septemvri municipality, Pazardzhik Province
 Vetren, Burgas Province - a village in the Burgas municipality, Burgas Province
 Vetren, Kyustendil Province - a village in the Nevestino municipality, Kyustendil Province
 Vetren, Silistra Province - a village in the Silistra municipality, Silistra Province
 Vetren, Stara Zagora Province - a village in the Maglizh municipality, Stara Zagora Province
 In North Macedonia (the name is written Ветрен):
 Vetren, North Macedonia - a village in the Delčevo municipality
 In Greece (the name was written Βέτρινα or Βέτρέν):
 Neo Petritsi (until 1927 Vetrina or Vetren) - a village in the Sintiki municipality in the Serres (regional unit)